Rəhimli (also, Ragimli) is a village and municipality in the Davachi Rayon of Azerbaijan.  It has a population of 1,363.  The municipality consists of the villages of Rəhimli and Maytablı.

References 

Populated places in Shabran District